Rodman Philbrick (born January 22, 1951) is an American writer of novels for adults and children. He has written popular children's books such as Freak the Mighty, Max the Mighty, The Last Book In The Universe, and has written other mysteries and thrillers for adults.

Early life 
He was born in Boston, Massachusetts, and currently lives in  both Maine and Florida. He attended Portsmouth High School and he also attended University of New Hampshire for a few semesters.

Career 
Rodman Philbrick has written many mysteries and thrillers for adults, including Brothers & Sinners, Coffins, and the T. D. Stash detective series, set in Key West, Florida, as well as a number of mysteries under the pen name William R. Dantz. Writing as Chris Jordan, Philbrick has published novels in the thriller genre: Taken, Trapped, and Torn, featuring former FBI special agent Randall Shane, who investigates the disappearance of missing children.

Two of his most popular children's books are Freak the Mighty and its sequel, Max the Mighty. Freak the Mighty was later adapted into a movie titled The Mighty. He wrote the cyberpunk, dystopian novel The Last Book in the Universe and the science fantasy novel REM World. Other works for young readers include The Young Man and the Sea, which is dedicated to his nieces Annie and Molly, and The Fire Pony, about two brothers on the run in the American West. The Mostly True Adventures of Homer P. Figg, set in the American Civil War, was named a Newbery Honor Book in 2010. A stage version of The Mostly True Adventures of Homer P. Figg  debuted at the Kennedy Center in Washington, D.C., in 2012. He and Lynn Harnett collaborated on scary books for young readers, including The House on Cherry Street, The Werewolf Chronicles, and Visitors, three trilogies published by Scholastic, Inc.

In December 2011, writing as Chris Jordan, Philbrick published Measure of Darkness, set in Boston. According to the author, Randall Shane enters the story in the first chapter, when he is accused of murdering a client. Zane and The Hurricane: A Story of Katrina, an adventure set in New Orleans, was published in February 2014. The Big Dark was released in print and audio versions in January 2016. A mystery for young readers, Who Killed Darius Drake? was published in 2017. Wildfire, a thrilling survival tale, was published in 2019.'We Own the Sky', a thrilling tale of an immigrant flying circus, set in Maine in 1924, was published in September 2022.

Philbrick has also written using the pen names W. R. Philbrick, William R. Dantz, and Chris Jordan.

Personal life 
Philbrick and Lynn Harnett were married from 1980 until her death, in 2012. Before Philbrick began writing full-time, he worked as a longshoreman and boat builder.

Awards

Maine Katahdin Award 2020

South Carolina Junior Book Award 2021-2022

'Wildfire', William Allen White Award 2022 (Kansas)

Bibliography

Freak The Mighty 
Freak the Mighty
Max the Mighty

Other works 
The Last Book in the Universe
The Young Man and the Sea
The Fire Pony
Lobster Boy (UK title for The Young Man and the Sea)
Rem World
Visitors (Novel Series) (With Lynn Harnett, 1997)
The Mostly True Adventures of Homer P. Figg (Newbery Honor Book, 2010)
The Journal of Douglas Allen Deeds: The Donner Party Expedition 1846
Zane and the Hurricane (2014)
The Big Dark (2016)
Who Killed Darius Drake? (2017)
Wildfire (2019)
Wild River (2021)

Books by alias Chris Jordan 
Taken (2007)
Trapped (2007)
 Torn' (2009), (NL: 'Verscheurd')
 Measure of Darkness (2011), (NL: 'In duisternis gehuld')

References

Other sources
 ALAN Review, winter, 1999; winter, 2001, Rodman Philbrick, "Listening to Kids in America," pp. 13–16.
 Booklist, December 15, 1993, Stephanie Zvirin, review of
 Freak the Mighty, p. 748;
 June 1, 1998, Susan Dove Lempke, review of Max the Mighty, pp. 1749–1750;
 December 15, 1998, Ilene Cooper, review of Freak the Mighty, p. 751;
 May 1, 2000, review of REM World: Where Nothing Is Real and Everything Is about to Disappear, p. 1670;
 November 15, 2000, Debbie Carton, review of The Last Book in the Universe, p. 636;
 August, 2001, Anna Rich, review of The Last Book in the Universe, p. 2142;
 January 1, 2002, Kay Weisman, review of The Journal of Douglas Alan Deeds: The Donner Party Expedition, p. 859;
 March 15, 2005, Patricia Austin, review of The Young Man and the Sea, p. 1313.
 Bulletin of the Center for Children's Books, January, 1994
 Deborah Stevenson, review of Freak the Mighty, p. 165
 July–August, 1996, p. 383
 April, 1998, Deborah Stevenson, review of Max the Mighty, p. 291
 March, 2004, Elizabeth Bush, review of The Young Man and the Sea, p. 291.
 Childhood Education, winter, 2000, Barbara F. Backer, review of REM World, p. 109.
 Horn Book, January–February, 1994, Nancy Vasilakis, review of Freak the Mighty, p. 74
 July–August, 1996, Martha V. Parravano, review of The Fire Pony, p. 464
 July–August, 1998, Nancy Vasilakis, review of Max the Mighty, p. 495. review of Freak the Mighty, p. 165
 March–April, 2004, Peter D. Sieruta, review of The Young Man and the Sea, p. 187.
 Journal of Adolescent and Adult Literacy, March, 2004, James Blasingame, interview with Philbrick, p. 518.
 Kirkus Reviews, February 15, 1998, review of Max the Mighty, p. 272
 January 15, 2004, review of The Young Man and the Sea, p. 87.
 Kliatt, March, 1999, review of Abduction, p. 26
 May, 2002, Paula Rohrlick, review of The Last Book in the Universe, p. 29
 January, 2004, Claire Rosser, review of The Young Man and the Sea, p. 12.
 New Yorker, December 13, 1993, pp. 115–116.
 Publishers Weekly, January 26, 1998, review of Max the Mighty, p. 91
 March 27, 2000, review of REM World, p. 81
 November 27, 2000, review of The Last Book in the Universe, p. 77
 January 14, 2002, review of Coffins, p. 46
 February 16, 2004, review of The Young Man and the Sea, p. 173.
 School Library Journal, December, 1993, Libby K. White, review of Freak the Mighty, p. 137
 September, 1996, Christina Linz, review of The Fire Pony, p. 206
 April, 1998, Marilyn Payne Phillips, review of Max the Mighty, p. 136
 July, 1998, Brian E. Wilson, review of Freak the Mighty, p. 56
 May, 2000, Nina Lindsay, review of REM World, p. 175
 November, 2000, Susan L. Rogers, review of The Last Book in the Universe, p. 160
 July, 2001, Louise L. Sherman, review of The Last Book in the Universe, p. 60
 December, 2001, Lana Miles, review of The Journal of Douglas Allen Deeds, p. 142
 February, 2004, Jeffrey Hastings, review of The Young Man and the Sea, p. 152
 October, 2004, review of The Young Man and the Sea, p. 54
 April, 2005, Larry Cooperman, review of The Young Man and the Sea, p. 76.
 Voice of Youth Advocates, April, 1994, p. 30; October, 1996, p. 212; June, 1998, p. 124.

https://rodmanphilbrick.com/

External links
 
 
 http://www.astal-ric.org/rodmanphilbrick.htm
 https://www.imdb.com/name/nm0679917/
 http://www.randomhouse.com/author/23848/rodman-philbrick
 http://www.fantasticfiction.co.uk/p/rodman-philbrick/
 Rodman Philbrick at Library of Congress Authorities — with 29 catalog records
 William R. Dantz at LC Authorities
 Chris Jordan at LC Authorities

1951 births
Living people
Newbery Honor winners
Shamus Award winners
20th-century American novelists
21st-century American novelists
American male novelists
20th-century American male writers
21st-century American male writers
Philbrick family